Problepsis sancta is a moth of the family Geometridae first described by Edward Meyrick in 1888. It is found in the Australian state of Queensland.

The wingspan is about 30 mm. Adults are satin white with a gold patch edged with shiny silver on each wing.

References

Moths described in 1888
Scopulini
Moths of Australia